The Netherlands men's national ice hockey team is the national men's ice hockey of the Netherlands.

The Netherlands are currently ranked 24th in the IIHF World Ranking and currently compete in IIHF World Championship Division II.

History
The Netherlands competed in the 1980 Olympic ice hockey competition.  They then competed in Pool A of the 1981 World Ice Hockey Championships.

In the 1980 Winter Olympics, The Netherlands, competed in the Red division group, and had a record of 1–3–1. They lost to Canada (10–1), they lost to the Soviet Union (17–4), they tied Japan (3–3), they beat Poland (5–3), and they lost to Finland (10–3).

One year later, the team returned to the top division in the 1981 World Ice Hockey Championships. In the first round, the team lost all of their games, followed by another 3 losses in the final round.

Tournament record

Olympic Games
1980 – 9th place

World Championship

1935 – 14th place
1939 – 11th place
1950 – 8th place
1951 – 10th place (3rd in Pool B)
1952 – 13th place (4th in Pool B)
1953 – 7th place (4th in Pool B)
1955 – 12th place (3rd in Pool B)
1961 – 18th place (4th in Pool C)
1963 – 20th place (5th in Pool C)
1967 – 21st place (5th in Pool C)
1969 – 18th place (4th in Pool C)
1970 – 20th place (6th in Pool C)
1971 – 21st place (7th in Pool C)
1972 – 20th place (7th in Pool C)
1973 – 16th place (2nd in Pool C)
1974 – 11th place (5th in Pool B)
1975 – 14th place (8th in Pool B)
1976 – 14th place (6th in Pool B)
1977 – 16th place (8th in Pool B)
1978 – 17th place (1st in Pool C)
1979 – 9th place (1st in Pool B)
1981 – 8th place
1982 – 16th place (8th in Pool B)
1983 – 17th place (1st in Pool C)
1985 – 14th place (6th in Pool B)
1986 – 13th place (5th in Pool B)
1987 – 15th place (7th in Pool B)
1989 – 17th place (1st in Pool C)
1990 – 16th place (8th in Pool B)
1991 – 15th place (7th in Pool B)

1992 – 13th place (2nd in Pool B)
1993 – 15th place (3rd in Pool B)
1994 – 18th place (6th in Pool B)
1995 – 16th place (4th in Pool B)
1996 – 19th place (7th in Pool B)
1997 – 19th place (7th in Pool B)
1998 – 24th place (8th in Pool B)
1999 – 25th place (1st in Pool C)
2000 – 24th place (8th in Pool B)
2001 – 25th place (5th in Division I, Group A)
2002 – 24th place (4th in Division I, Group A)
2003 – 23rd place (4th in Division I, Group A)
2004 – 22nd place (3rd in Division I, Group A)
2005 – 22nd place (3rd in Division I, Group B)
2006 – 25th place (5th in Division I, Group B)
2007 – 25th place (5th in Division I, Group A)
2008 – 26th place (5th in Division I, Group A)
2009 – 25th place (5th in Division I, Group B)
2010 – 24th place (4th in Division I, Group A)
2011 – 24th place (4th in Division I, Group A)
2012 – 25th place (3rd in Division I, Group B)
2013 – 25th place (3rd in Division I, Group B)
2014 – 27th place (5th in Division I, Group B)
2015 – 28th place (6th in Division I, Group B)
2016 – 29th place (1st in Division II, Group A)
2017 – 28th place (6th in Division I, Group B)
2018 – 29th place (1st in Division II, Group A)
2019 – 28th place (6th in Division I, Group B)
2020 – Cancelled due to the COVID-19 pandemic
2021 – Cancelled due to the COVID-19 pandemic
2022 – 28th place (2nd in Division II, Group A)

Team

Roster for the 1980 Olympics
1 G Ted Lenssen
30 G John de Bruyn
6 D Patrick Kolijn
9 D George Peternousek
11 D Allan Pluimers
12 D Rick van Gog
14 D Henk Hille
17 D Frank van Soldt
2 F Harrie van Heumen
3 F Larry van Wieren (C)
4 F Ron Berteling
5 F Dick Decloe
8 F Jack de Heer
10 F Jan Janssen
15 F Klaas van den Broek (A)
16 F Leo Koopmans
18 F Brian de Bruyn
19 F Chuck Huizinga
20 F Corky de Graauw
25 F William Klooster

References

External links

IIHF profile
National Teams of Ice Hockey

 
Ice hockey teams in the Netherlands
National ice hockey teams in Europe